The Titken House (Danish: Titkens Gård) is a listed property situated at the corner of Bredgade (No. 60) and Fredericiagade (No. 18) in the Frederiksstaden district of central Copenhagen, Denmark.

History

Origins

The property is located on land that formerly belonged to the vast gardens of Sophie Amalienborg. The site was acquired by the wealthy grocer Niels Titken (1698-1771) in 1754. The present building on the site was constructed for him in 1754-1756. It has been suggested that the architect was Lauritz de Thurah since he has signed an estimate of needed materials but this has been questioned (see below). Titken's grocery store was originally located in the basement with entrance from Fredericiagade.

Titken's property was listed in the new ]]cadastre]] of 1756 as No. 71 MM in St. Ann's Quarter. The property was marked on Christian Gedde's district map of St. Ann's East Quarter from 1757 as No. 327.

The property was listed in the new cadastre of 1806 as No. 180 in <St. Ann's East Quarter. It was owned by J. C. Schutzmann at that time.

Frederocoagade 18

The building was expanded by kitchen master (køkkenmester) H. F. Funch  with the construction of Fredericiagade 18 in 1835. The naval officer and shipbuilder Henrik Gerner (1741-1787) had resided in the demolished building from 1784 to 1787. Nearby Gernersgade is named after him. Another naval officer, Jost van Dockum (1753-1834), had lived at the same address in 1784-1797. He would later be in charge of the Prøvestenen Battery during the Battle of Copenhagen in 1807. Fredericiagade 18 was rebuilt in 1835.

Later history
Most of the residents were at the time of the 1845 census craftsmen or lower-ranking military officers. One of the officers was >Peter Frderik Steinmann	 (1782-1954), owner of Tybjerggaard. The later organist and composer Niels Peter Hillebrandt (1815) was also among the residents. He lived there with his wife, three children and miother-in-law.

Peter Frederik Steinmann (1812-1894), a son of the former resident by the same name, resided at No. 19 in 1853–54. He would later serve as Minister of Defence in 1874–75.

Architecture
 
 

The Titken House is built to a simple Baroque style design and consists of three storeys over a high cellar. The 11 bay long façade on Bredgade is only broken up by a three-bay median risalit tipped by a low triangular pediment. The facade on Fredericiagade is six bays long and features a two-bay triangular pediment.

In their book Danmarks Arkitektur, Byens huse - byens plan, Sys Hartmann and Villads Villadsen question the assumption that the building was designed by Lauritz de Thurah. They find it unlikely that he would have followed Eigtved's guidelines for buildings in Frederiksstaden to the extent that is the case and with such a meager result. They describe the 11-bay facade on Bredgade as monotonous and the median risalit with its triangular pediment as " crabbed". The two-bay triangular pediment on Fredericiagade is described as notoriously disharmonic and the roof that continues all the way down to the too tall windows is compared to "a hat pulled all the way down to the eye brows". The main entrance was originally located in the median risalit. It was accessed by way of a sandstone staircase and opened to a vestibule. This is also different from most of De Thurah's buildings where the main entrance is usually placed in a gateway in one of the sides.

Hartmann and Villadsen concludes that the façade may have been designed by some of Eigtved's associates after his death in 1754 and that Lauritz de Thurah may just have approved them.

Fredericiagade 18 is six bays wide and has a central gateway which opens to the courtyard.

The building was listed on the Danish registry of protected buildings and places by the Danish Heritage Agency in 1918.

Today
The Titken House is today owned by the University of Copenhagen.

Gallery

References

External links

 Niels Titken

Frederiksstaden
Listed residential buildings in Copenhagen
Houses completed in 1756
1756 establishments in Denmark